Esra Solmaz (born March 20, 1995) is a Turkish women's football striker, who last played in the Turkish Women's Third League for Balokesir Büyükşehir Belediyespor with jersey number 9. In 2011, she played for the Turkish girls' national U-17 team.

Early life
Born in Elazığ on March 20, 1995, she grew up in Yalova with her family.

Career

Club

She received her license on February 9, 2010 for Eskişehirspor, where she played until the end of the 2012–13 season capping 37 times and scoring 29 goals. In August 2012, she suffered a serious leg injury, which led her to stay away from the football field some time. After one season with Kızılcık Spor in Sakarya Province. she transferred to Trabzon İdmanocağı in October 2014. She scored 13 goals in 20 games of two First League seasons. In the 2017-18 season, she moved to Balıkesir Büyükşehir Belediyespor playing in the Third League. After netting 12 goals in eight matches, she retired.

International
Esra Solmaz was called up to the Turkey girls' U-17 team, and debuted in the 2012 UEFA Championship qualifying round – Group 7 match against Serbia on September 29, 2011. She cappen twice for the Turkey U-17 nationals.

Career statistics

References

External links

Living people
1995 births
People from Elazığ
People from Yalova
Turkish women's footballers
Women's association football forwards
Eskişehirspor women's players
Trabzon İdmanocağı women's players